The Lie is a quiz show co-produced by 3Studios, STV Productions and Motion Content Group.

On the show a team of two people must decide which of the statements given is the lie in order to progress and win money.

Versions
The Irish version of the show is on TV3, hosted by Jonathan McCrea. The first show aired on 17 February 2014 at 20:00. Episodes air on Mondays and Fridays.  A second season premiered in January 2015 with 40 episodes and is now stripped with five episodes a week.

The Scottish version was shown on STV, presented by Scottish comedian Susan Calman. It first aired in the spring of 2014.

A Welsh language version of the show premiered on S4C in January 2015 entitled Celwydd Noeth ("Bare-Faced Lie"), hosted by Nia Roberts.

References

2014 Irish television series debuts
Irish quiz shows
Virgin Media Television (Ireland) original programming